J.C. Moore can refer to:

 J.C. Moore (coach), American college football coach from the early 20th century
 J.C. Moore (politician), American state legislator from Kansas